George Little (10 April 1754 – 22 July 1809) was a United States Navy officer. He served in the Massachusetts State Navy during the Revolutionary War and in the United States Navy during the Quasi-War with France.

Military career
At age 25, Little was appointed first lieutenant of Massachusetts ship Protector in 1779, and was aboard in 1781 when she fought a running battle with the British ship Thames. In a later engagement, he was captured, imprisoned, but later escaped.

He was given command of Massachusetts ship Winthrop which captured two British privateers, armed brig Meriam, and a number of other vessels. Commissioned captain, USN, 4 March 1799, Little was given command of the frigate Boston, which was still under construction. At the end of June, Capt. Little served as member of the first U.S. Navy court martial, that of John Blake Cordis, second lieutenant of the Constitution and brother-in-law of Little's first lieutenant, Robert Haswell. The Boston sailed 24 July, on the first of two cruises down the American coast to the West Indies. The next year saw a second cruise, which culminated with the capture of the French corvette Le Berceau and seven other ships.

On their return, Little found himself in the middle of a political firestorm, the capture of Le Berceau having taken place two weeks after the signing of the Treaty of Mortefontaine had ended the Quasi-War. He and his fellow officers faced a court martial for the alleged looting of the personal possessions of the French officers, of which they would be acquitted but not without Little being dismissed by the Navy in 1801. This was not his only legal fight, as a challenge to the legitimacy of the taking of the Danish trader, the Flying Fish, would result in a legal case which, as Little v. Barreme, was heard by the United States Supreme Court in 1804, the ruling going against Little. Little also fought in court over an agreement with Silas Talbot to split the prize money for Les Deux Anges, taken by the Boston in January 1800. This case, Talbot v. Little, also reached the Supreme Court, but was eventually dismissed without hearing, leaving Little and his crew the victors.

Namesakes
Two destroyers have been named USS Little in his honor.

References

 Leiner, Frederick C., "Anatomy of a Prize Case: Dollars, Side-Deals, and Les Deux Anges", American Journal of Legal History, vol. 39, pp. 215–234.
Preble, George Henry, "Ships of the Nineteenth Century, Part I", The United Service, vol. 10 (1884), pp. 517–518.

1754 births
1809 deaths
United States Navy personnel of the American Revolution
People of Massachusetts in the American Revolution
People from Marshfield, Massachusetts
People from Weymouth, Massachusetts
American military personnel of the Quasi-War
United States Navy officers